Palshi Zashi is a village, in Sangrampur tehsil of Buldhana district, Maharashtra State,  India.
The day of athavadi bazaar (weekly) of the village is Friday.

The main business of village is farming. 80-90% population is served on agriculture.
The place of nearby market for farmers is warvat and khamgaon.

The village did not have a primary health center (reported to start from 1 April 2014) and only an anganwadi centre.

The village consists of two school 
Z.P. Primary school up to 7th standard and S.M.V. Highschool up to 10th standard.

It is famous for the Shree shankargiri maharaj temple and the festival of Mahashivratri
A 6 to 7 qtls. Of Rodga is made which is a wonder of this place.

There are people of various caste and religions who live together as a family. The village consist of most of the people with the surname Marode.
The other festivals celebrated are Shiv jayanti ( since 1983) jijau jayanti; dr. Ambedkar jayanti; mahatma phule jayanti; and cultural festivals as diwali, dasara, holi, pola etc.

The village consist of a library initiated by the youths of the village started on 23 March 2013.

Geography
It is on north direction of Sangrampur on MH State Highway 195 connecting Jalgaon Jamod - Sangrampur - Malegaon Bazar - Telhara - Warula on MH SH 24. It connects to National Highway 6 at Nandura via Sangrampur - Jalgaon Jamod and at Khamgaon via Shegaon.

Demographics
 India census, Palshi Zashi had a population of 3141.

Description 

The town post office Postal Index Number ( PIN code) is 444202 and PIN is shared with Warwat Bakal, Kakanwada, Sangrampur post offices.

Some of nearby villages are Tamgaon, Bodkha, Wakana, Ladnapur, Tunki,  Sagoda, Palsoda, Dhamangaon, Kolad, Bawanbir, Wadgaon Pr Adgaon, Kolad, Kakanwada Bk, Kakanwada Kh, Pimpri Adgaon, Niwana, Banoda Eklara, Jamod, Durgadatiya, Wankhed, Danapur, Hingani Bk, Raikhed, Belkhed, Gadegaon, Tudgaon, Isapur, Malegaon Bazar,

Nearby towns are Sonala, Akot, Sangrampur, Jalgaon Jamod, Telhara, Shegaon
.

References

Villages in Buldhana district